Manjeet Kullar (also known as Manjeet Kular) is an Indian film and television actress. She is famous for her role of Devi Sati in Om Namah Shivay 1997 & for the role of nikki In Dhadkan movie 2000.

Career
Manjeet Kular acted very well in Om Namah Shivay as Devi Sati. Kular acted in many Hindi films including notable films like Tehkhaana, Dil Ka Kya Kasoor, Dhadkan, Ikke Pe Ikka, Mohabbat Ke Dushman, Mr. Bond, Paandav, Sahiban and Yalgaar. She did many Punjabi films in the 1990s, including Mirza Sahiban, Vairee, Mirza Jatt, Deson Pardeson, Jaildaar, Main Maa Punjab Dee, Pachtawa, and Ishq Nachavye Gali Gali. She also worked on some TV serials. She was last seen in 2006's hit Mehndi Wale Hath, where she played the role of the evil mother in law. She is currently doing two Punjabi films. One film is being directed by Sham Ralhan and the other by National Award-winning Director Balwant Dullat.

Filmography

Television

References

External links
 
 

Living people
20th-century Indian actresses
21st-century Indian actresses
Actresses in Hindi cinema
Actresses in Punjabi cinema
Year of birth missing (living people)